Replenishment may refer to:

Processes and projects 
 Beach replenishment or Beach nourishment, a coastal-management process that artificially replaces sediments lost to erosion
 Collaborative planning, forecasting, and replenishment, an inventory-management scheme trademarked by the Voluntary Interindustry Commerce Standards Association
 Lake Chad replenishment project, a proposed major water-diversion scheme to channel water from the Ubangi River to Lake Chad
 Replenishment (photography), a process used in processing photographic paper and film

Ships 
 Replenishment oiler, a naval auxiliary ship that can conduct underway replenishment on the high seas
 Underway replenishment, a method of transferring fuel, munitions, and stores from one ship to another while under way
 Vertical replenishment, a method of supplying seaborne vessels by helicopter

See also 
 Replenish (disambiguation)